Rebecca Ann  Herbst (born May 12, 1977) is an American actress, known for playing nurse Elizabeth Webber on the ABC Daytime drama General Hospital, a role she originated on August 1, 1997, and Suzee, an alien, on the Nickelodeon show, Space Cases.

Early life
Herbst was born in Encino, California. She grew up with parents Debbie and Wayne, and has an older sister, Jennifer. She is not related to General Hospital co-star Rick Hearst (who portrays Ric Lansing, Elizabeth Webber's ex-husband), whose surname was Herbst before he changed it professionally. Herbst was a competitive figure skater as a child, and at age sixteen decided to concentrate on acting.

Career
At age six, Herbst stated she wanted to be on television so that she could play with the toys; she began filming commercials and has since appeared in over 60 nationally. She has guest-starred in television series including: Highway to Heaven, L.A. Law, Beverly Hills, 90210, Step By Step,  Boy Meets World, Sister, Sister, Days of Our Lives and Brotherly Love. She starred in films including Kaleidoscope, Why Me? and Hefner: Unauthorized. She was also featured in the Goo Goo Dolls 1995 music video "Naked". She was a series regular as Suzee on the second season of the Nickelodeon show, Space Cases from 1996 to 1997.

Herbst began as a series regular as Elizabeth Webber on the ABC Daytime soap opera General Hospital on August 1, 1997. In 1999, Herbst won the Soap Opera Digest Award for Outstanding Younger Lead Actress, and also received a Daytime Emmy Award nomination for Outstanding Younger Actress. In 2000, Soap Opera Update named Herbst No. 6 on their list of Woman of 2000. She was nominated in 2003 for the Soap Opera Digest Award for Outstanding Younger Actress. In 2007, Herbst appeared on Tyra Banks' talk show to help Tyra through "soap opera school." Herbst was nominated for a Daytime Emmy for Outstanding Supporting Actress in a Drama Series in 2007 and 2012.

Personal life
Herbst dated former General Hospital co-star Ingo Rademacher and photographer Johnny Lindesmith in the late 1990s; Lindesmith and Herbst were engaged on December 30, 1999. On June 1, 2001, she married former General Hospital co-star Michael Saucedo (who portrayed Juan Santiago). They have three children, two sons (Ethan and Emerson) and a daughter (Ella).

Herbst also designs clothes. She has designed most of her Daytime Emmy dresses, and dresses for co-stars Natalia Livingston and Kimberly McCullough for the 33rd Daytime Emmy Awards ceremony.

Herbst became a spokeswoman for Purpose Skincare in 2007. She participates in the Smile Train charity.

Filmography

Awards and nominations

References

External links 
 
 

1977 births
Living people
20th-century American actresses
21st-century American actresses
Actresses from Greater Los Angeles
American child actresses
American film actresses
American soap opera actresses
American television actresses
People from Encino, Los Angeles